, also known as simply Blaze & Blade, is a multiplayer action role-playing game developed by T&E Soft for the PlayStation and Microsoft Windows. It is the first in the series (the other being Blaze & Blade Busters, which uses the same engine), and the only one released outside Japan.

Gameplay
Blaze & Blade is a "hack and slash" action RPG with a heavy emphasis on puzzle solving. The game allows for characters to be created with one of eight classes and offered the ability to choose the sex of each character. The PlayStation version supports multiplayer capabilities as both the MultiTap and cable link are supported.

Plot
Adventurers come across an ancient lithograph during their travels, supposedly very valuable, and desire to verify the authenticity of this artifact. To do so, the adventurers dive into more dungeons to collect magical gems which in legend fit into the inset of the lithograph. The lithograph united with these magical gems is said to impart great power to the wielders of this artifact, and if the adventurers do receive great power due to reuniting these treasures it will serve as proof to them that they have found the legendary artifact of lore.

Reception

The PC version received unfavorable reviews according to the review aggregation website GameRankings. Eric Bratcher of NextGen said that the game was "crap in a box. If you get this 'game' as a gift, throw it away – even Goodwill probably won't take it." In Japan, Famitsu gave the PlayStation version a score of 23 out of 40.

The game won the award for "Worst Game of the Year" at GameSpots Best and Worst of 2000 Awards.

References

External links
 

1998 video games
Action role-playing video games
Multiplayer and single-player video games
PlayStation (console) games
SouthPeak Games
T&E Soft games
THQ games
Video games developed in Japan
Video games featuring protagonists of selectable gender
Windows games
Conspiracy Entertainment games